Erstavik is a manor house in Nacka Municipality, Sweden. Located south of Stockholm, at an inlet of the Baltic Sea.

The surrounding property is one of the few remaining in Sweden still held as fideicommissum. It is located next to the Nackareservatet nature reserve. The property was acquired by Herman Petersen in the 1700s.

See also
List of castles in Sweden
Petersen House

References

Further reading

External links
 
 Official website

Houses completed in 1765
Manor houses in Sweden
1765 establishments in Sweden
Buildings and structures in Stockholm